Necronauts was a story appearing in the British comics anthology 2000 AD, by British comics writer Gordon Rennie and artist Frazer Irving. It brought Irving to public attention as his high contrast black and white artwork complemented Rennie's dark storyline.

Publication history
The outline for the story and was written in 1991 and was originally intended for Tundra Publishing, where Rennie had published White Trash, however:

The story formed part of a general push by editor Andy Diggle to get more horror into the comic: "I commissioned Necronauts because I thought horror would work well in 2000 AD."

It eventually started in the 2000 AD end of year special in 2000, Prog 2001, and continued in issues #1223-1230.

Characters

Charles Fort, investigator of anomalous phenomena
Arthur Conan Doyle, creator of Sherlock Holmes with a strong interest in the paranormal
H. P. Lovecraft, teller of dark tales
Harry Houdini, escapologist and debunker of fraudulent Spiritualists
A mysterious evil flier, who while never named is clearly based on Charles Lindbergh.

Plot
In 1926, while practising a new trick, Houdini has a near-death experience, awakening the mysterious Sleepers. Meanwhile, Lovecraft is visited by a talking raven, and a séance that Sir Arthur is attending is attacked by a strange force that possesses the medium. Sir Arthur travels to New York City to speak to Houdini, where they are attacked by Tcho-Tchos, summoned by The Sleepers' human minions (The Hidden Masters of the World: The Illuminated Ones).

While Houdini and Lovecraft travel back into the spiritual plane, Fort and Sir Arthur must protect their bodies from the assembling dark forces. However, there is also a traitor in their midst, and one of their number will die.

Collected editions
The story has been reprinted as a trade paperback by Rebellion Developments:

Necronauts (64 pages, December 2007, February 2008)
Tharg's Terror Tales Presents Necronauts and Love Like Blood (collects Necronauts and A Love Like Blood, 128 pages, October 2011)

Awards

2000 Eagle Awards, Favourite Comic Strip to Appear in a UK Magazine or Comic (runner-up)
2001 National Comics Awards, Best New Talent (Tied win): Frazer Irving for Necronauts
2004 Diamond Comics Awards, Graphic Novel of the Year

See also
Fort: Prophet of the Unexplained, another comic starring Fort and Lovecraft also illustrated by Irving
The Searchers, another comic featuring Fort and Doyle
The Arcanum, a novel by Tom Wheeler, which also teams Doyle, Houdini and Lovecraft
Cthulhu Mythos in popular culture

Notes

References

Necronauts at 2000 AD online

External links
Necronauts Tells A Dark History, Comics Bulletin

Reviews
Trade review, Comics Bulletin, November 9, 2003
Review of the trade paperback, October 19, 2006

Cultural depictions of Arthur Conan Doyle
Cultural depictions of Harry Houdini